A CDK (cyclin-dependent kinase) inhibitor is any chemical that inhibits the function of CDKs. They are used to treat cancers by preventing overproliferation of cancer cells. The US FDA approved the first drug of this type, palbociclib (Ibrance), a CDK4/6 inhibitor, in February 2015, for use in postmenopausal women with breast cancer that is estrogen receptor positive and HER2 negative. Several compounds are in clinical trials.

CDKs as cancer target
See also Ribociclib#Mechanism of action re: CDK4

In many human cancers, CDKs are overactive or CDK-inhibiting proteins are not functional. Therefore, it is rational to target CDK function to prevent unregulated proliferation of cancer cells.
 
However, the validity of CDK as a cancer target should be carefully assessed because genetic studies have revealed that knockout of one specific type of CDK often does not affect proliferation of cells or has an effect only in specific tissue types. For example, most adult cells in mice proliferate normally even without both CDK4 and CDK2.

Furthermore, specific CDKs are only active in certain periods of the cell cycle. Therefore, the pharmacokinetics and dosing schedule of the candidate compound must be carefully evaluated to maintain active concentration of the drug throughout the entire cell cycle.

Types
Malumbres et al., categorized CDK inhibitors based on their target specificity:

 Broad CDK inhibitors: compounds targeting a broad spectrum of CDKs
 Specific CDK inhibitors: compounds targeting a specific type of CDK
 Multiple target inhibitors: compounds targeting CDKs as well as additional kinases such as VEGFR or PDGFR

Approved

CDK4/CDK6 inhibitors

Several drugs have been approved by the US FDA for HR-positive, HER2-negative breast cancer.

Palbociclib (PD-033299, trade name Ibrance) gave encouraging results in a phase II clinical trial on patients with HR-positive, HER2-negative advanced breast cancer. The addition of PD-0332991 to letrozole trebled median time to disease progression to 26.1 months compared with 7.5 months for letrozole alone. The FDA granted it Accelerated Approval in Feb 2015.

Ribociclib (LEE011, trade names Kisqali and Kryxana), is US FDA approved in combination with letrozole for treatment of breast cancer in patients with HR-positive, HER2-negative advanced metastatic breast cancer. A phase three clinical trial found that ribociclib administered in combination with letrozole increased the likelihood of progression free survival to 63% in the first 18 months of therapy versus 42% for letrozole alone. Subsequent analysis demonstrated that patients treated with ribociclib and letrozole showed a median progression-free survival of 25.3 months.
 
Abemaciclib (LY2835219, trade name Verzenio) was approved in September 2017 by the FDA for "adult patients who have hormone receptor (HR)-positive, human epidermal growth factor receptor 2 (HER2)-negative advanced or metastatic breast cancer that has progressed after taking therapy that alters a patient's hormones".

In clinical trials
There are more than 10 CDK inhibitor compounds that have gone through or currently ongoing clinical trials, as of 2009. Most of them are targeting multiple CDKs, but some are targeting specific CDKs. For example, P1446A-05 targets CDK4. Various types of cancers including leukemia, melanoma, solid tumors, and other types are being targeted. In some cases, very specific cancer types, such as 'melanoma positive for cyclin D1 expression' are targeted to maximize the efficacy.

, trilaciclib (G1T28, CDK4/6 inhibitor, G1 Therapeutics) is in multiple phase II clinical trials. The drug is being tested as a method for reducing the adverse effects of chemotherapy. In August 2019, trilaciclib received breakthrough therapy designation for its ability to minimize chemotherapy-induced bone marrow suppression. , the drug is under Food and Drug Administration (FDA) priority review for small-cell lung cancer with an application decision date of February 15, 2021. Trilaciclib was approved for medical use in the United States in February 2021.

Other
 Purvalanol A, Olomoucine II.
Based on molecular docking results, Ligands-3, 5, 14, and 16 were screened among 17 different Pyrrolone-fused benzosuberene compounds as potent and specific inhibitors without any cross-reactivity against different CDK isoforms. Analysis of MD simulations and MM-PBSA studies, revealed the binding energy profiles of all the selected complexes. Selected ligands performed better than the experimental drug candidate (Roscovitine). Ligands-3 and 14 show specificity for CDK7 and Ligands-5 and 16 were specific against CDK9. These ligands are expected to possess lower risk of side effects due to their natural origin. 

Interpretation of dynamic simulations and binding free energy studies unveiled that Ligand2 (Out of 17 in-house synthesized pyrrolone-fused benzosuberene (PBS) compounds) has a stable and equivalent free energy to Flavopiridol, SU9516, and CVT-313 inhibitors. Ligand2 scrutinized as a selective inhibitor of CDK2 without off-target binding (CDK1 and CDK9) based on ligand efficiency and binding affinity.

See also
 
Zotiraciclib

References 

Protein kinase inhibitors